Paul Adolf Hirsch (24 February 1881 in Frankfurt am Main25 November 1951 in Cambridge, England) was a German industrialist. He was also a musician, bibliophile and musicologist who assembled the largest private music library in Europe. The Hirsch Collection is now housed at the British Library.

Biography
Paul Hirsch was born into a wealthy Jewish mercantile family, the fourth of five children of Anna Pauline (née Mayer) and Ferdinand Hirsch (1834–1916). He had two brothers— (18831977), a noted art collector, and Carl Siegmund Hirsch, a district court judge who died in 1938 in the Buchenwald concentration camp. Ferdinand Hirsch founded Hirsch and Company, an iron works, in 1867. After completing school, Paul Hirsch entered the family business, training in England and France, which also broadened his acquaintance with musicians and collectors. 

In 1911 he married  (1889–1969), daughter of a Frankfurt banker. They had two sons and two daughters.

From 1930 to 1933 Hirsch was vice president of the Frankfurt Chamber of Industry and Commerce. He was also served on the advisory board for export trade, the foreign trade committee of the German Industry and Commerce Association, and chaired the foreign trade office.

He was a member of the German People's Party.

Hirsch died on 23 November 1951 in Cambridge.

Building the collection
Hirsch, an accomplished violinist who had studied with Adolf Rebner, took a keen interest in publications concerning all aspects of music—performance, history and theory. In 1896 he began to collect historical musical works, focusing  on early printed editions of Haydn, Mozart and Beethoven, 19th-century opera and early theoretical works. He participated in the Second Specialist Music Exhibition at the Leipzig Crystal Palace in 1909. In 1922 Hirsch hired musicologist Kathi Meyer (later Meyer-Baer) as a research assistant and opened the library to the public two days a week. Hirsch and Meyer began compiling a catalog of the library contents.

In 1928 and 1929 Hirsch purchased the library of Berlin music critic  at auction. With this addition of approximately 15,000 items to the 5,000 he already possessed, he now owned the largest and best-kept private music library in Europe. Housed in a wing of the house on Neue Mainzer Straße, the library had its own concert hall. Hirsch organized over four hundred chamber music evenings, during which he often played first violin in his "house quartet", which on occasion would include his friend Ludwig Rottenberg and Rottenberg's son-in-law Paul Hindemith.

The library was a valuable resource for musicians, musicologists and students. The visitor register for the years 1923 to 1935 lists many people well known in Frankfurt's musical circles, including Licco Amar, Theodor Wiesengrund Adorno, conductor and music critic Artur Holde, Erich Itor Kahn, pianist Emma Lübbecke-Job, singer Carl Rehfuss, Ludwig Rottenberg, Hermann Scherchen, Mátyás Seiber and Helmut Walcha. The list also records visitors who came from as far away as Tokyo. Other friends in Hirsch's musical circle included Wilhelm Furtwängler, Bruno Walter and Stefan Zweig.

Hirsch's collection encompasses four and a half centuries of Western music. A few of the items that he was most proud of, according to librarian and musicologist Alec Hyatt King, were:
 Jean Gerson's Collectorium super magnificat, printed in Esslingen am Neckar, Germany, by Conrad Fyner in 1473, which contains the first musical notes ever printed.
 The only known copy of Francesco Caza's Tractato vulgare de canto figurato (Milan, 1492)
 The Glückwünschende Kirchen Motetto, also known as Gott ist mein König, Johann Sebastian Bach's earliest published work, printed in nineteen parts at Mühlhausen in 1708. One of only three known copies.
 Bach's own copy of Clavier-Übung I with corrections in his hand.
 One of two known copies of the first edition of La Marseillaise, printed in 1792.
 Edward Elgar's May-Song, with decorations by Walter Crane, one of five or ten copies on vellum, 1901. 

Opera is particularly well represented, as noted by King:

Between 1922 and 1934 Hirsch issued facsimile editions of some library items, edited by Johannes Wolf and published by Martin Breslauer. The German National Library has cataloged eleven of these facsimiles and reprints.

Emigration
When the National Socialists seized power in 1933, Hirsch's situation became difficult because of his Jewish heritage. The Bibliophile Societies came under the control of the Reich Chamber of Culture, where Jews could no longer hold board positions. In 1934 Hirsch resigned as chair of the Frankfurt Society and joined the Kulturbundes Deutscher Juden. 

Early in 1936, Hirsch wrote to his friend Edward J. Dent, Professor of Music at the University of Cambridge, proposing a contractual loan of the music library to the university. Dent helped arrange the loan and facilitated the emigration of Hirsch's family to Cambridge later that year. Despite efforts by Frankfurt mayor Friedrich Krebs to prevent export or to confiscate the music library, Hirsch was able to transfer almost all of it to Cambridge in several train cars.

Hirsch's collection was placed in the newly-built Cambridge University Library where it took up almost  of shelving on the fifth floor. Despite his expatriation from Germany in 1938, Hirsch was briefly interned as an enemy alien in 1940, which worsened his already fragile health. This, in combination with his strained finances, led to his decision to sell the music library. In 1946, with assistance from Dent, he sold it to the British Museum for £120,000 although he continued to purchase additional items which he donated to the museum. In 1973, the British Library Act 1972 created the British Library, which took ownership of the British Museum library.

Selected bibliography
Hirsch wrote a number of papers about items in his library. A 75-page catalog of works by W. A. Mozart was published in 1906 in honor of the composer's 150th birthday. In 1928 he published the first volume of the Katalog der Musikbibliothek Paul Hirsch.
He also published several articles about the iron business.

In German
  
 
 
 
 
 
 
  The first three volumes were originally published by Martin Breslauer, Berlin, and were reprinted by Morsum/Sylt:Cicero Presse of Hamburg in 1993. The fourth volume, which includes addenda to the first three, was completed in Cambridge with the help of Edith Schnapper and Hirsch's daughters, Irene Hartogs-Hirsch and Renate Schuster. 
 Vol. 1: Theoretische Drucke bis 1800. (1928)
 Vol. 2: Opern-Partituren. (1930) 
 Vol. 3: Instrumental- und Vokalmusik bis etwa 1830. (1936)
 Vol. 4: Erstausgaben, Chorwerke in Partitur, Gesamtausgaben, Nachschlagewerke etc. Ergänzungen zu Bd. 1–3. Cambridge University Press (1947)

In English

Notes

References

Sources

Further reading
 
 
 
 
 
  
  A comprehensive listing of music in the collection
  A comprehensive listing of books in the collection

1881 births
1951 deaths
Bibliophiles
German bibliophiles
German industrialists
People from Frankfurt
People from Cambridge
German Jews
German emigrants to the United Kingdom
Jewish emigrants from Nazi Germany to the United Kingdom